Bernhard Stiefenhöfer (born 1 September 1972) is a former German male canoeist who won several medals at senior level the Wildwater Canoeing World Championships.

References

External links
 

1972 births
Living people
German male canoeists
Sportspeople from Cologne